.bsp or .BSP may refer to:

 .bsp (EAGLE), a file extension used by EAGLE for Gerber bottom solder paste files
 .bsp (Quake), a file extension used by Quake for binary space partitioning files

See also 
 BSP (disambiguation)